Raimundo Sousa Santos (born 18 August 1967) is a Portuguese long-distance runner. He competed in the men's 5000 metres at the 1992 Summer Olympics.

References

External links
 

1967 births
Living people
Athletes (track and field) at the 1992 Summer Olympics
Portuguese male long-distance runners
Olympic athletes of Portugal
Place of birth missing (living people)